Animal spirits or animal spirit may refer to:

The spirits of animals in the belief system of animism
Animal spirits (Keynes), the emotional component of economies represented in consumer confidence
Animal Spirits (book), a 2009 book by economists George Akerlof and Robert Shiller
The Animal Spirits, a 2010 album by American metal band Slough Feg
"Animal Spirit", a song by Bloom
"Animal Spirits", a song by funk band Vulfpeck